El Señor de los Monitos, or simply El Señor Monitos, is a sculpture in Tlaquepaque, in the Mexican state of Jalisco. Camilo Ramírez made this piece in 2020. The statue is six meters tall and weighs 1.5 tons.

References

External links

 

2020 establishments in Mexico
2020 sculptures
Outdoor sculptures in Jalisco
Sculptures of men in Mexico
Statues in Jalisco
Tlaquepaque